The Zambales local elections was held on May 13, 2019 as part of the 2019 general election. Voters will select candidates for all local positions: a town mayor, vice mayor and town councilors, as well as members of the Sangguniang Panlalawigan, the vice-governor, governor and representatives for the two districts of Zambales. Incumbent Governor Amor Deloso and Vice Governor Angel Magsaysay-Cheng are seeking re-election for their second term.

Former Governor Hermogenes Ebdane, who served for two terms from 2010 until his defeat in 2016, won his election as Governor, defeating incumbent Amor Deloso. Incumbent Vice Governor Angel Magsaysay-Cheng was also defeated by Ebdane's running mate Jefferson Khonghun.

Provincial elections

Congressional elections

1st District

2nd District

Provincial board elections

1st District

|-bgcolor=black
|colspan=8|

2nd District 

|-bgcolor=black
|colspan=8|

City and municipal elections

1st District

City: Olongapo
Municipalities: Castillejos, San Marcelino, Subic

Olongapo

Castillejos

San Marcelino

Subic
Jay Khonghun is the incumbent.

2nd District
Municipalities: Botolan, Cabangan, Candelaria, Iba, Masinloc, Palauig, San Antonio, San Felipe, San Narciso, Santa Cruz

Botolan
Doris "Bing Maniquiz" Jeresano is the incumbent.

Cabangan

Candelaria

Iba
Jun Rundstedt Ebdane is the incumbent.

Masinloc

Palauig

San Antonio

San Felipe

San Narciso

Santa Cruz

References

2019 Philippine local elections
Elections in Zambales
May 2019 events in the Philippines
2019 elections in Central Luzon